Korynetes caeruleus also known as the steely blue beetle is a predatory beetle in the family Cleridae. The species name is occasionally misspelled as "coeruleus" (e.g.,), but the spelling caeruleus is preserved by Opinion 604 of the ICZN, issued in 1961.

The larvae live in tunnelled wood that has been infested by the common furniture beetle and the deathwatch beetle and they feed on the larvae of these wood-damaging insects. The presence of Korynetes caeruleus indicates a heavy infestation of either woodboring insect. Adult females mate and lay eggs near or just inside exit holes, then die. It is not to be confused with Necrobia rufipes, which is also a steely blue beetle in the family Cleridae. Both beetles have a significance in forensic entomology but for different reasons.

References

External links
Entomologie Stuttgart Image

Cleridae
Beetles described in 1775
Taxa named by Charles De Geer